A kaza (plural: , , ;) is an administrative division historically used in the Ottoman Empire and is currently used in several of its successor states. The term is from Ottoman Turkish and means 'jurisdiction'; it is often translated 'district', 'sub-district' (though this also applies to a  ), or 'juridical district'.

Ottoman Empire
In the Ottoman Empire, a kaza was originally a "geographical area subject to the legal and administrative jurisdiction of a kadı. With the first Tanzimat reforms of 1839, the administrative duties of the kadı were transferred to a governor (kaymakam), with the kadıs acting as judges of Islamic law. In the Tanzimat era, the kaza became an administrative district with the 1864 Provincial Reform Law, which was implemented over the following decade. A kaza unified the jurisdiction of a governor (kaymakam) appointed by the Ministry of the Interior, a treasurer (chief finance officer), and a judge (kadı) in a single administrative unit. It was part of efforts of the Porte to establish uniform, rational administration across the empire.

The kaza was a subdivision of a sanjak and corresponded roughly to a city with its surrounding villages. Kazas, in turn, were divided into nahiyes (governed by müdürs and mütesellims) and villages (karye, governed by muhtars). The 1871 revisions to the administrative law established the nahiye (still governing a müdür), as an intermediate level between the kaza and the village.

Turkey
The early Republic of Turkey continued to use the term kaza until it renamed them ilçe in the 1920s.

Arab countries
The kaza was also formerly a second-level administrative division in Syria, but it is now called a mintaqah.

The kaza or qadaa is used to refer to the following:

 districts of Iraq (second-level, below the governorate)
 districts of Lebanon (second-level, below the governorate)
 Sub-districts (third-level, below the governorate and the district)
 subdistricts of Mandatory Palestine
 Counties of Israel

See also 
 Alcalde
 Qadi

Notes

References

Subdivisions of the Ottoman Empire
Types of administrative division
Arabic words and phrases